Killymarron or Killymarran is a very small rural townland situated between Tydavnet and Ballinode villages in County Monaghan, Ireland.

References

Townlands of County Monaghan